Paternus was a Roman statesman who served as Consul in 269.

Bibliography
 

Imperial Roman consuls
3rd-century Romans

Year of birth unknown
Year of death unknown